National Symphony Orchestra refers to any of several orchestras playing classical music:
 National Symphony Orchestra,  Washington, D.C., US
 Danish National Symphony Orchestra, founded 1925
 Estonian National Symphony Orchestra, founded 1926
 Iraqi National Symphony Orchestra, re-established 1970
 Latvian National Symphony Orchestra
 Lebanese National Symphony Orchestra, founded 1999
 Myanmar National Symphony Orchestra
 National Iranian Symphony Orchestra, founded 1998
 National Symphony Orchestra of Colombia, re-established 2004
 National Symphony Orchestra of Cuba, established early 1920s
 National Symphony Orchestra (Dominican Republic), founded 1941
 National Symphony Orchestra Ghana
 RAI National Symphony Orchestra, founded 1994
 RTÉ National Symphony Orchestra of Ireland, adopted name 1989
 National Symphony Orchestra (Mexico), founded 1946
 National Symphony Orchestra (Peru), founded 1938
 National Symphony Orchestra of Polish Radio
 National Symphony Orchestra (Taiwan), founded 1986
 National Symphony Orchestra of Ukraine
 Syrian National Symphony Orchestra, Damascus